"You Belong to Me" is a popular music ballad from the 1950s. It is well known for its opening line, "See the pyramids along the Nile". The song was published in Hollywood on April 21, 1952, and the most popular version was by Jo Stafford, reaching No. 1 on both the UK and US singles charts.

Conception and composition
"You Belong to Me" is credited to Chilton Price, Pee Wee King, and Redd Stewart.

Price, a songwriting librarian at WAVE Radio Louisville, had written the song in its virtual entirety as "Hurry Home to Me", envisioning the song as an American woman's plea to a sweetheart serving overseas in World War II. Afforded songwriting credit on the song mostly in exchange for their work in promoting it, King and Stewart did slightly adjust Price's composition musically and lyrically, shifting the focus from a wartime background "into a kind of universal song about separated lovers" (World War II having ended some years previously) and changing the title to "You Belong to Me". Price had previously had success with another hit which she had written, "Slow Poke", under a similar arrangement with the two men.

Chart performance
The first recording of the song, in February 1952, was by Joni James. She had seen the sheet music in the Woods Building in Chicago, and the lyrics attracted her. She recorded the song in Chicago, and it was released in March on the local Sharp Records label. After she signed to MGM, it was reissued as her second single on that label on August 5, 1952, after Jo Stafford, Patti Page, Ella Fitzgerald and Dean Martin had covered it. James' version was also issued on MGM Records for national distribution. The best-known version of the song in early 1952 was recorded after James, by Sue Thompson on Mercury's country label as catalog number 6407. It was soon covered by Patti Page, whose version was issued by Mercury (catalog number 5899), with "I Went to Your Wedding" (a bigger Page hit, reaching No. 1) on the flip side. It entered the Billboard chart on August 22, 1952, and lasted 12 weeks on the chart, peaking at No. 4. A cover version by Dean Martin, released by Capitol Records (catalog number 2165), was also in play at that time. This version first entered the US chart on August 29, 1952, and remained on it for 10 weeks, reaching No. 12. All the versions were combined in the rankings on the Cash Box charts, and the song reached No. 1 on those charts as well, lasting on the chart for more than half a year.

In the UK, the song also topped the sheet music sales chart. It first entered the chart on November 1, 1952, peaking at No. 1 on December 27, where it stayed for 7 weeks. Jo Stafford's recording was amongst the first batch to be issued in October 1952. British cover versions were also available by Larry Cross, Alma Cogan with Jimmy Watson (trumpet), Monty Norman, Dickie Valentine with Ted Heath and his Music, Victor Silvester and his Ballroom Orchestra, Jimmy Young, and Wally Fryer and his Perfect Tempo Dance Orchestra. American recordings by Patti Page, Grady Martin and his Slew Foot Five (vocal by Cecil Bayley), Dean Martin, Joni James, Ken Griffin (organ), Jan Garber and his Orchestra (vocal by Roy Cordell) and Mickey Katz (a Yiddish parody) and his Orchestra were available in the UK. In all, the song remained in the sheet music chart for 24 weeks. Despite the many recordings issued in the UK, only that by Stafford appeared in the singles sales chart.

A cover version by Jo Stafford became the most popular version. It was recorded on June 24, 1952, when she was several months pregnant. Stafford's husband, Paul Weston, produced the record and provided orchestral accompaniment. Issued by Columbia Records as catalog number 39811, it was Stafford's biggest hit, topping the charts in both the United States and the United Kingdom (the first song by a female singer to top the UK Singles Chart). The single first entered the US chart on August 1, 1952, and remained there for 24 weeks.

The Stafford version appeared in the first ever UK singles chart of November 14, 1952 (then a top 12) and reached number 1 for a single week on January 16, 1953, its tenth week on chart. It thus became only the second record to top the chart, and remained on it for a total of 19 weeks.

Stafford was to re-record "You Belong to Me" twice, both in the 1960s. The first of these later recordings was made on January 13, 1963, and issued in January 1964 on a stereo Capitol LP, The Hits Of Jo Stafford. On May 14, 1969, another recording was made, issued by Reader's Digest on a various artists boxed set, They Sing The Songs.

Other notable versions
A version by the Duprees made the Billboard Top 10, reaching No. 7 in 1962.

In popular culture
The song has also appeared on many soundtracks:
The version by The Duprees is featured in the 2016 game Mafia 3, and can be heard in the in-game radio station WBYU
A solo acoustic version was recorded by Bob Dylan for the 1992 album Good as I Been to You but was eventually left off as an out-take; the recording surfaced two years later in the soundtrack for the 1994 film Natural Born Killers.
A version by Jason Wade was part of the soundtrack to the 2001 animated film Shrek. 
The song was part of the soundtrack to the 1972 film Avanti.
Singer Tori Amos also recorded the song for the Julia Roberts film Mona Lisa Smile in 2003. 
Actress Rose McGowan sang it on the soundtrack for the Planet Terror segment of the 2007 film Grindhouse.
The Marshall Crenshaw Band performs the song on the soundtrack album of Francis Ford Coppola's 1986 fantasy film Peggy Sue Got Married as well as performing in the movie's reunion scenes.
The song figures prominently in the 1953 movie Forbidden starring Tony Curtis, Joanne Dru and Lyle Bettger. The melody is used for the opening credits. In a scene reminiscent of "Casablanca", Eddie (Tony Curtis) asks Allan (Victor Sen Yung), the Lisbon Club pianist, why he plays a somber tune every time Eddie appears at the club. He answers that Christine never comes when he is there. However, in that moment, seeing that Christine (Joanne Dru) has just entered he plays the melody. It is followed by the club singer (Mamie Van Doren) singing the first verse (dubbed by Virginia Rees).
Bette Midler sings the song during a scene from the 1986 movie Down and Out in Beverly Hills.
Vonda Shepard's cover was used frequently on the TV series Ally McBeal (1997–2002) alongside romantic scenes of Ally McBeal and Billy Thomas.
Mary Higgins Clark referenced the song throughout her novel of the same name, which was published by Pocket Books on April 1, 1999.
The song plays in the movie Blast From The Past (1999). 
American band The Waking Hours recorded a version of the song for their 2003 album The Early Years.
In the British film The Deep Blue Sea (2011), directed by Terence Davies, the drinkers in a London pub perform the song, which later modulates into Jo Stafford's version.
The song was featured in the 2013 video game BioShock Infinite as part of its Burial at Sea story add-on. In the game, the song is performed by the lead character Elizabeth and sung by her voice actress, Courtnee Draper (with fellow actor Troy Baker, who had previously portrayed Booker DeWitt, in said game providing accompanying acoustic guitar); footage of Draper performing the song in the recording studio is shown during the game's end credits.
The song is featured in the 2015 romantic drama period film Carol (film), directed by Todd Hayes.
The song is featured in the 2018 gothic horror film The Nun, a spin-off of The Conjuring 2.
The song is featured on the soundtrack of the Netflix movie The Irishman
Kate Rusby recorded the song on her 2005 album The girl who couldn't fly.
The Patsy Cline version of this song is featured in the 1995 Winona Ryder film How to Make an American Quilt.
A version of this song is featured in "The White Lotus" Season 2 sung by Mia (Beatrice Grannò)

See also
List of number-one singles from the 1950s (UK)
List of number-one singles of 1952 (U.S.)

Notes

References

1952 songs
1952 singles
Number-one singles in the United States
UK Singles Chart number-one singles
Songs written by Chilton Price
Pop ballads
Patti Page songs
Jo Stafford songs
Bob Dylan songs
Dean Martin songs
Songs written by Pee Wee King
Songs written by Redd Stewart